Salah (Arabic: صلاح, Ṣalāḥ) is a Biblical and an Arabic given name and family name. Its meaning in the Bible is 'mission', or 'sending', whereas the Arabic meaning is 'righteousness', 'goodness', or 'peace'.

Given name
Salah (biblical figure), an ancestor of the Israelites according to the Table of Nations in Genesis 10
Salah (dancer), full name Salah Benlemqawanssa, a hip-hop dancer 
Salah Aboud Mahmoud, an Iraqi former officer
Salah Abdel Sabour, an Egyptian poet, editor, playwright and essayist
Salah Abdel-Shafi, a Palestinian economist and ambassador
Salah Abdul Rasool Al Blooshi, a Bahraini held in extrajudicial detention in the United States on suspicion of terrorism
Salah Abu Seif, an Egyptian film director
Salah Ahmed Ibrahim, a Sudanese writer, poet and diplomat
Salah Ali Al-Ghali, a governor of South Darfur
Salah Amin, an Egyptian footballer
Salah Assad, an Algerian footballer and sports manager
Salah Bachir, Canadian philanthropist and businessman
Salah Bakour, an Algerian footballer 
Salah Al Bandar, a British-Sudanese known for role in revealing the Bandargate scandal in Bahrain
Salah Bouchekriou, an Algerian handball player and coach
Salah Choudhury, a Bangladeshi journalist 
Salah Dessouki, an Egyptian Olympic fencer
Salah Edin, real name Abid Tounssi, a Dutch-Moroccan rapper 
Salah Ezzedine, a Lebanese businessman accused of running a pyramid scheme
Salah Gaham, an Algerian French concierge who died during the 2005 civil unrest in France, see 2005 French riots#Salah Gaham's death
Salah Goudjil, an Algerian politician, belonging to the Secretariat of the Executive Committee of the National Liberation Front 
Salah Halabi, Egyptian army officer
Salah Al-Hamdani, an Iraqi poet, actor and playwright
Salah Hissou, a Moroccan long-distance runner
Salah Jadid, a Syrian general and political figure in the Baath Party, and the country's de facto leader from 1966 until 1970 
Salah Jahin, an Egyptian poet, lyricist, playwright and cartoonist
Salah Khalaf, (aka Abu Iyad), deputy chief and head of intelligence for the Palestine Liberation Organization, and a senior official of Fatah
Salah Larbès, an Algerian international footballer
Salah Mansour, an Egyptian film actor
Salah Mohsen, an Egyptian footballer
Salah Mejri, a Tunisian basketball player 
Salah Nasr, an Egyptian former head of the country's General Intelligence Directorate
Salah Omar al-Ali, a former Iraqi politician, minister and ambassador
Salah Qoqaiche, a retired Moroccan long-distance marathon runner
Salah Ragab, an Egyptian drummer and jazz musician
Salah Salem, an Egyptian military officer and politician
Salah Samadi, an Algerian football player
Salah Shehade, a Palestinian Hamas movement member
Salah Sid, an Algerian-born British radio broadcaster, producer and voice-over artist
Salah Soliman, an Egyptian footballer
Salah Stétié, a Lebanese writer and poet who writes in the French language
Salah Suheimat, a Jordanian politician and Member of the Jordanian Parliament
Salah Taher, an Egyptian painter
Salah Tarif, a Druze Israeli politician who served as a member of the Israeli Knesset
Salah Mohammed Tubaigy, a Saudi Arabian forensics officer
Salah Zulfikar, an Egyptian actor and movie star
Sallah, a character from Indiana Jones.
Mohammed Salah, A web 3 developer and entrepreneur From Kerala, India

Surname 
Asher Salah, an Israeli historian, specialist and translator in Italian Hebrew literature
Hussein Ahmed Salah, a Djibouti long distance runner athlete
 Kamal Salah, birth name of Sami Michael, an Iraqi-born Israeli Hebrew author
 Kamal Al Din Salah, an Egyptian diplomat
Maha Naji Salah, a Yemeni writer and social activist
Mohamed Salah, an Egypt footballer who plays for Liverpool F.C.
Trish Salah, a Lebanese Canadian feminist writer, educator and sociologist
Raed Salah, a Palestinian leader, head of the northern branch of the Islamic Movement in Israel
Yiḥyah Salaḥ, known as the Maharitz, an 18th-century Yemenite rabbi, author and scholar

Football
Arturo Salah, a Chilean former football player, manager and administrator 
Ibrahim Salah, an Egyptian footballer, plays for Zamalek and Egypt 
Luay Salah, an Iraqi football player, plays for Al-Zawra'a and has played for Iraq
Mohamed Salah (football manager), an Egyptian coach and retired footballer

Other uses
Ibn al-Salah, a Shafi'i hadith scholar and author

See also
Beni Salah (disambiguation)
Salah (disambiguation)
Salah ad-Din (name)
Saleh (name)

References

Arabic-language surnames
Arabic masculine given names